The Chinese American Bank was an overseas Chinese bank in the United States headquartered in New York City, with branch offices in Chinatown, Manhattan and in Chinatown, Flushing.

The privately owned community bank was established in 1967 to serve the Chinatown community. A burgeoning community of Chinese immigrants in the Flushing Chinatown prompted the bank to open another branch there.

The Chinese American Bank was acquired by United Commercial Bank in the second quarter of 2007; United Commercial Bank later went defunct and was acquired by East West Bank in November 2009.

References 

Banks based in New York City
Banks established in 1967
Chinese American banks
Chinese-American culture in New York City
Privately held companies based in New York City
Defunct banks of the United States
1967 establishments in New York City
Banks disestablished in 2007
2007 mergers and acquisitions